The Winter King is a forthcoming British historical fiction television series based on Bernard Cornwell's The Warlord Chronicles series of novels, starring Iain De Caestecker as King Arthur, and told by Derfel Cadarn portrayed by Stuart Campbell, born a Saxon, but raised among Celtic Britons, he starts is life as one of Merlin's orphans and worked his way up to one of Arthur's officers.

Premise
The story is a retelling of the Arthurian legend and  takes place in  Post-Roman Dark Age Britain, a land where the warlord Arthur has been banished and Merlin has disappeared, Saxons are invading and a child-king sits unprotected on the throne. We meet a vain and unpopular Lancelot; an ambitious and scheming Guinevere; Merlin, who is a more absent Druid than a mystic magician; and Mordred, who is Uther's grandson and legitimate heir. The tale is told by the elderly Saxon-born monk Derfel Cadarn for Igraine, a young queen, long after the death of Arthur.

Cast and characters 
 Iain De Caestecker as Arthur Pendragon, the illegitimate son of King Uther, an exiled warlord who returns to Britain.
 Jordan Alexandra as Guinevere, Arthur's wife, she is a hard, ambitious woman who cares very little for others and seems only to want power and a high social status.
 Stuart Campbell as Derfel Cadarn, the narrator of the story, he is a warrior and disciple of Arthur and even though he sees Arthur's flaws, he recognizes greatness and knows that Arthur is the only hope for Britain.
 Ellie James as Nimueh, a priestess saved by Merlin because she can see the gods - he gives her power, wisdom and learning.
 Eddie Marsan as Uther, High King of all Dumnonia, old and battle tested. He commands incredible authority, over almost all, bar Merlin.
 Nathaniel Martello-White as Merlin, a politician, powerful, enlightened, and absolute. Fearless in the face of a King’s wrath he follows his connection to his Gods in all things.
 Daniel Ings as Owain, Uther's champion of Dumnonia, an experienced but not always honest senior warrior.
Ken Nwosu as Sagramor, a fierce Numidian from Africa Nova and veteran of the old Roman army who has followed Arthur to Britain after the collapse of the Western Roman Empire.
 Andrew Gower as Sansum, loosely based on the Cornish saint Samson of Dol, a Catholic priest and later a Bishop. His disciple is Derfel Cadarn. Sansum is described as unsympathetic and intriguing.
 Valene Kane as Morgan,  Arthur’s half-sister and another bastard child of King Uther. She is a sharp-tongued and independent minded pagan and student of Merlin.
 Simon Merrells as Gundleus, King of rival kingdom Siluria. Imposing and savage, Gundleus is prepared to slaughter whoever he needs to secure power.
 Steven Elder as Bishop Bedwin
 Aneirin Hughes as Gorfydd
 Emily John as Ceinwyn
 Tatjana Nardone as Ladwys
 Billy Postlethwaite as Cadwys

Production

Development
On 22 April 2022, Sony Pictures Television announced that their recently acquired production company Bad Wolf were adapting the first book in Bernard Cornwell's Warlord Chronicles” trilogy, The Winter King into a 10-part series for British television. The series was developed for television by Kate Brooke and Ed Whitmore, premiering in 2023 on ITVX, the upcoming streaming platform from U.K. broadcaster ITV Other writers include Nessah Muthy.  Lachlan Mackinnon and Catrin Lewis Defis is producing. American cable network Epix was at one point adapting “Warlord Chronicles” with Bad Wolf but is no longer involved. Otto Bathurst will be the lead director, with additional episodes directed by Farren Blackburn.

Filming
Aske Alexander Foss will serve as lead Director of Photography shooting blocks 1 & 3 with Stephan Pehrsson shooting block 2
The series will shoot in Wales and the West Country in the second half of 2022. In July 2022 the Tropiquaria Zoo in Watchet, Somerset was used as a base for filming within a  radius of the Watchet wildlife park and aquarium. A set has been built next to a former  Wye Valley quarry near Chepstow, Monmouthshire, Wales.

This drama will also be filmed in Bristol on a temporary film set with a fortified encampment at Patchway Studios off Highwood Road in Patchway Trading Estate. The set will mainly be a ‘rocky canyon’ structure would be made up of prefabricated polyurethane foam panels on scaffolding. The filming operation would vary between 70 and 150 cast and crew across 70 days between July 2022 and January 2023. The series is supported by The Bristol Film Office.

On 15 September 2022 filming took place in Wiltshire and near Bradford on Avon in South West England. Local Bristol media reported on 30 September that parts of the Blaise Castle Estate in Henbury have been cordoned off as a filming location for this television drama. A specific area of Blaise Castle grounds have been transformed into a village with sets being built. On 11 October 2022 the filming moved to The Brabazon Hangars/Filton Airfield north of Bristol.

References

External links
 

Television series based on Arthurian legend
Works based on Merlin
Costume drama television series
English-language television shows
Serial drama television series
2023 British television series debuts
2020s British drama television series
Television series set in the 5th century
British adventure television series
Druidry in fiction
Television series by Sony Pictures Television
Television shows based on British novels
Television series set in the Middle Ages
Television shows set in Europe
Witchcraft in television
Wizards in television